Mario Martos Serrano (born 14 November 1991) is a Spanish footballer who plays as a forward for UD Ciudad de Torredonjimeno.

Club career
Born in Jaén, Andalusia, Martos played youth football with local Real Jaén, and made his senior debuts in with the B-team in the regional leagues. His first competitive appearance with the main squad occurred in the dying stages of the 2011–12 season, in Segunda División B; on 13 July 2012, he renewed his contract for one year after rejecting an offer from Granada CF.

In his second season with the Whites, Martos scored three goals in 32 matches, achieving promotion to Segunda División via the play-offs. He also started in a 0–1 away loss against Atlético Madrid in the Copa del Rey, on 28 November 2012.

On 2 August 2013, Martos signed a new two-year deal with Jaén after rejecting offers from Getafe CF and Recreativo de Huelva. He made his professional debut on 16 October, playing the last 29 minutes in a 2–0 home win over Deportivo de La Coruña in the domestic cup. He first appeared in the second level 30 days later, coming on as a late substitute in a 3–0 success against Real Zaragoza also at the Nuevo Estadio de La Victoria.

On 2 January 2014, Martos was loaned to UD Almería B until June. He rejoined Jaén in June but, after severing ties on 30 January 2015, returned to his previous club hours later.

In August 2015, Martos signed for Cypriot Second Division side Olympiakos Nicosia.

References

External links

1991 births
Living people
Footballers from Jaén, Spain
Spanish footballers
Association football forwards
Segunda División players
Segunda División B players
Tercera División players
Real Jaén footballers
UD Almería B players
Linares Deportivo footballers
Algeciras CF footballers
Cypriot Second Division players
Olympiakos Nicosia players
Football League (Greece) players
OFI Crete F.C. players
Spanish expatriate footballers
Expatriate footballers in Cyprus
Expatriate footballers in Greece
Spanish expatriate sportspeople in Cyprus
Spanish expatriate sportspeople in Greece